Duah is a surname. Notable people with the surname include:

Abu Duah (born 1978), Ghanaian sprinter
Alexandra Duah (died 2000), Ghanaian actress
Emmanuel Duah (born 1976), Ghanaian footballer
Jürgen Duah (born 1985), German footballer
Nana Arhin Duah (born 1980), Ghanaian footballer
Solomon Duah (born 1993), Finnish footballer